Fort railway station is a major rail hub in Colombo, Sri Lanka.  The station is served by Sri Lanka Railways, with many inter-city and commuter trains entering each day.  Fort Station is the main rail gateway to central Colombo; it is the terminus of most intercity trains in the country.

History

When the railways first opened in Ceylon (Sri Lanka) in 1864, trains terminated at Colombo Terminus Station, a now-retired station near Maradana.  The earliest station to be called Fort was a small station, built in 1877 when the Coast Line was built.  This original station sat on the site of present-day Secretariat Halt just west of today's Fort Station.

The present Fort Station was opened in 1917, as a new central station for Colombo. This has been constructed similar to Manchester Victoria station. The station was built on land reclaimed from the Beira Lake.  This project was part of a scheme started in 1906 to reorganize the railway within Colombo, where Colombo Terminus Station was closed and replaced by the new Maradana Station. This was ceremonially opened by G.P. Green who was the General Manager at CGR. Fort was added in 1917 to serve the city centre.

The station was bombed by the LTTE in 2008.

Location

Fort Station is in the heart of the city, located next to Colombo Fort and Pettah and close to the meeting points of the A1 and A4 highways.  The station provides access to businesses and offices in Colombo Fort, as well as the markets at Pettah.

Fort Station is a couple kilometres away from Maradana Station, the other major rail station in Colombo.

Transport connections
In addition to providing connection between the many trains that serve the station, Fort Station also provides connections to bus services through the Central Bus Stand in Pettah.  Colombo Secretariat Station, the city terminus for the Airport Express, is located to the west of the station, with no direct pedestrian connection.

Services

The station is served from the east by the Main line, which leads to several other major routes in Sri Lanka's railway network.  Most of these trains terminate at Fort Station.  The station is served to the south-west by the Coastal line, leading to Galle and Matara.

Fort station is also a hub for commuter rail within the Colombo metropolis.

Inter-city trains

Commuter and local trains

Continuity

Station layout

The station has a through-station layout, despite being the terminus for many services.  This allows most platforms to serve both terminating and through trains.  The platforms are oriented east-west.  The ticket hall is to the north of the platforms.

Trivia

The station was used as a film location in the film A Common Man directed by Chandran Rutnam and starring Ben Cross and Ben Kingsley.

See also

Railway stations in Sri Lanka
Sri Lanka Railways
List of railway stations by line order in Sri Lanka
Sri Lanka Railways

References

Railway stations on the Coastal Line
Railway stations on the Main Line (Sri Lanka)
Railway stations in Colombo